The All-Ireland Senior Hurling Championship of 1969 was the 83rd staging of Ireland's premier hurling knock-out competition.  Kilkenny won the championship, beating Cork 2-15 to 2-9  in the final at Croke Park, Dublin.

The championship

Participating counties

Format

Leinster Championship
First round: (1 match) This is a single match between two of the weaker teams drawn from the province of Leinster.  One team is eliminated at this stage, while the winners advance to the quarter-final.

Quarter-final: (1 match) This is a single match between the winner of the first round and another team drawn from the province of Leinster.  One team is eliminated at this stage, while the winners advance to the semi-finals.

Semi-finals: (2 matches) The winners of the quarter-final join three other Leinster teams to make up the semi-final pairings.  Two teams are eliminated at this stage, while two teams advance to the Leinster final.

Final: (1 match) The winners of the two semi-finals contest this game.  One team is eliminated at this stage, while the winners advance to the All-Ireland semi-final.

Munster Championship

Quarter-final: (2 matches) These are two lone matches between the first four teams drawn from the province of Munster.  Two teams are eliminated at this stage, while two teams advance to the semi-finals.

Semi-finals: (2 matches) The winners of the two quarter-finals join the other two Munster teams to make up the semi-final pairings.  Two teams are eliminated at this stage, while two teams advance to the final.

Final: (1 match) The winners of the two semi-finals contest this game.  One team is eliminated at this stage, while the winners advance to the All-Ireland final.

All-Ireland Championship

Semi-final: (1 match) This is a lone match between London and the Leinster champions.  One team is eliminated at this stage, while the winner advances to the All-Ireland final.

Final: (1 match) The semi-final winner and the Munster champions contest the final.

Fixtures

Munster Senior Hurling Championship

Leinster Senior Hurling Championship

All-Ireland Senior Hurling Championship

Championship statistics

Scoring

Hat-trick heroes:
First hat-trick of the championship: Charlie McCarthy for Cork against Clare (Munster quarter-final)
Second hat-trick of the championship: Paddy Molloy for Offaly against Laois (Leinster quarter-final)
Third hat-trick of the championship: Paddy Molloy for Offaly against Wexford (Leinster semi-final)
Fourth hat-trick of the championship: Willie Walsh for Cork against Tipperary (Munster final)
Fifth hat-trick of the championship:Fr. Tom Walsh for Kilkenny against Cork (All-Ireland semi-final)
Widest winning margin: 26 points
Laois 5-12 : 0-1 Westmeath (Leinster first round)
Most goals in a match: 10
Offaly 8-10 : 2-5 Laois (Leinster quarter-final)
Most points in a match: 32
Kilkenny 3-22 : 1-10 London (All-Ireland semi-final)
Most goals by one team in a match: 8
Offaly 8-10 : 2-5 Laois (Leinster quarter-final)
Most goals scored by a losing team: 3
Wexford 3-11 : 5-10 Offaly (Leinster semi-final)
Most points scored by a losing team: 12
Waterford 1-12 : 3-18 Tipperary(Munster quarter-final)

Miscellaneous

 Offaly reach the Leinster final for the first time since 1928.
 Kilkenny's 2-15 to 2-9 victory over Cork in the All-Ireland final was their biggest triumph over their archrivals since the 1905 All-Ireland final.  The score on that occasion was 7-7 to 2-9.

Top scorers

Season

Single game

Debutantes
The following players made their début in the 1969 championship:

Retirees
The following players played their last game in the 1969 championship:

References

 Corry, Eoghan, The GAA Book of Lists (Hodder Headline Ireland, 2005).
 Donegan, Des, The Complete Handbook of Gaelic Games (DBA Publications Limited, 2005).
 Nolan, Pat, Flashbacks: A Half Century of Cork Hurling (The Collins Press, 2000).

All-Ireland Senior Hurling Championship